The  Honduras lunar sample displays  are two commemorative plaques consisting of small fragments of Moon specimen brought back with the Apollo 11 and Apollo 17 lunar missions and given in the 1970s to the people of Honduras by United States President Richard Nixon as goodwill gifts.

Description

Apollo 11

Apollo 17

History 
The Honduras Apollo 17 "goodwill Moon rocks" plaque display came into the possession of retired colonel Roberto Agurcia Ugarte; it is unclear how Ugarte obtained it. Ugarte put the plaque up for sale, covering the stars of the Honduras flag to conceal the plaque's origin. Alan Rosen, a Florida fruit distributor, purchased it from Ugarte  for what he claims was $50,000 in 1996.

In 1998 Rosen attempted to sell the rock and was caught in a sting operation, Operation Lunar Eclipse; U.S. Government agents recovered the rock.

A lawsuit filed against Rosen, United States v. One Lucite Ball Containing Lunar Material (One Moon Rock) and One Ten Inch by Fourteen Inch Wooden Plaque, was settled in 2003. Rosen forfeited the Honduras Apollo 17 lunar sample plaque display, which was presented in 2004 to Honduran President Ricardo Maduro. The Honduras Apollo 17 goodwill Moon rock plaque, of as 2012, is on display in Tegucigalpa at Centro Interactivo Chiminike.

According to Robert Pearlman, the whereabouts of the Honduras Apollo 11 goodwill lunar display are unknown.

See also
 List of Apollo lunar sample displays

References

Bibliographic information

Further reading

External links

Stolen and missing moon rocks
Honduras–United States relations
Science and technology in Honduras